La Prieta is a 1981 essay by the Tejana feminist scholar Gloria E. Anzaldúa, originally published in the anthology This Bridge Called My Back.

About
The essay explores Anzaldúa's identity as a white/mestiza Tejana from a formerly affluent, sixth-generation Texan family. She explores the racism, colorism, sexism, heteronormativity, and classism of her parents and grandparents, who scorned her for being too dark-skinned and who identified with whiteness and Americanness rather than with Mexican, Indigenous, and Black people.

The essay belongs to the Nettie Lee Benson Latin American Collection at The University of Texas at Austin, having acquired Anzaldúa's works in 2005.

See also
Discrimination based on skin color

References

External links
La Prieta, Hypotheses

1981 works
Anti-black racism in the United States
Anti-indigenous racism in the United States
Anti-Mexican sentiment
Chicano literature
Discrimination based on skin color
Feminist essays
Lesbian feminist literature
LGBT Hispanic and Latino American culture
Marxist feminism
Mestizo
Queer theory
Tejana feminism
White American culture in Texas
Works about racism
Works about social class
Works by Gloria E. Anzaldúa